Kenneth Boatright (born March 6, 1990) is an American football defensive end in the National Football League who is currently a free agent. He also was a member of the BC Lions in the Canadian Football League (CFL). He played college football at Southern Illinois University.

Early years
Boatright attended Bolingbrook High School. As a senior, he helped the team win the conference championship (9-3 record) and reach the second round of the playoffs.

He also practiced track and volleyball.

College career
Boatright accepted a football scholarship from NAIA Midland University. As a freshman free safety, he tallied 39 tackles and one sack.

As sophomore, he registered 82 tackles (second on the team), 2 sacks, 2 interceptions, 11 pass breakups and one blocked a punt. He received honorable-mention All-Conference honors. He transferred after the season to Southern Illinois University.

In 2010, he was redshirted and converted him into a defensive end. As a junior, he collected 6.5 sacks (led the team and eighth in the conference), 13.5 tackles for loss (led the team and fourth in the conference) and 2 fumble recoveries.

As a senior, he posted 62 tackles (third on the team), 5.5 sacks (led the team and seventh in the conference), 10 quarterback hurries (led the team), 13.5 tackles for loss (led the team and third in the conference). He contributed to the defense finishing 10th in the nation in rushing defense (111.27 yards per game). He made a career-high 8 tackles against Southeast Missouri State University. He had 6 tackles (2.5 for loss) and 2 sacks against Indiana State University. He blocked a punt and recovered it for a touchdown against the University of Northern Iowa.

Professional career

Seattle Seahawks
Boatright was signed as an undrafted free agent by the Seattle Seahawks after the 2013 NFL Draft on April 27. On August 2, he was waived with a shoulder injury and was placed on the injured reserve list the following day. He was cut on June 16, 2014.

Dallas Cowboys
On August 1, 2014, he was signed as a free agent by the Dallas Cowboys. He was released on August 30 and signed to the practice squad one day later. On December 13, he was promoted to the active roster.

On September 1, 2015, he was waived with a career threatening neck injury by the Cowboys. On the following day, he cleared waivers and was reverted to the team's injured reserve list. He was released on May 6, 2016.

BC Lions (CFL)
On February 21, 2017, Boatright signed with the BC Lions of the Canadian Football League. He was released on October 3.

Personal life
Boatright is one of 12 children in his family.

References

External links
Southern Illinois bio
Seattle Seahawks bio

1990 births
Living people
People from Bolingbrook, Illinois
Players of American football from Illinois
American football defensive ends
Canadian football defensive linemen
American players of Canadian football
Seattle Seahawks players
Southern Illinois Salukis football players
Sportspeople from DuPage County, Illinois
Dallas Cowboys players
BC Lions players
Midland Warriors football players